State Bridge is an unincorporated community in Eagle County, in the U.S. state of Colorado.

History
A post office called State Bridge was established in 1909, and remained in operation until 1915. The community is named for a bridge near the town site.

References

Unincorporated communities in Eagle County, Colorado
Unincorporated communities in Colorado